Arvest Bank is a bank headquartered in Bentonville, Arkansas, with branches in Arkansas, Kansas, Oklahoma, and Missouri. It is almost entirely owned by the Walton family.

In addition to banking, Arvest provides financial services including loans, deposits, treasury management, asset management, wealth management, life insurance, credit cards, title insurance, mortgage loans, and mortgage servicing.

Company history
Arvest's charter dates back to McIlroy Bank & Trust, founded in 1871. During the financial crisis of 2007-2008, the bank declined funds from the Troubled Asset Relief Program.

Acquisitions 
In December 2009, in a transaction organized by the Federal Deposit Insurance Corporation, the bank acquired SolutionsBank of Overland Park, Kansas, which suffered from bank failure. SolutionsBank had 6 branches and assets of $511 million. In June 2012, the bank acquired Union Bank. In March 2013, the bank acquired 29 branches in Arkansas, Kansas, Missouri, and Oklahoma from Bank of America. In April 2018, the bank acquired Bear State Financial, with 42 branches and $2.2 billion in assets.

Controversies
In June 2010, Blanche Lincoln, a U.S. senator from Arkansas, was accused of pushing for an increase to an asset threshold in a financial regulation bill to benefit Arvest. Lincoln stated that she did not want any bank in Arkansas to be affected by the bill.

External links

References

1871 establishments in Arkansas
Banks based in Arkansas
Banks established in 1871
Bentonville, Arkansas
Privately held companies based in Arkansas